Major General Christopher Geoffrey Woolner  & Two Bars (18 October 1893 – 10 January 1984) was a senior British Army officer who served in the First World War and Second World War.

Military service
Born on 18 October 1893 in Kensington, London, England, Christopher Woolner was educated at Marlborough College and the Royal Military Academy, Woolwich. He was commissioned as a second lieutenant into the Royal Engineers on 21 December 1912. Among his fellow graduates were Ivor Thomas, William Morgan, Douglas McConnel and William Mirrlees, all future generals. He was promoted on 4 December 1914 to lieutenant and first saw active service in the First World War on the Western Front. Over the course of the war he was mentioned in despatches twice, wounded once and received the Military Cross and two Bars for gallantry and leadership. The citation for his MC reads:

From October 1917 to July 1918 Woolner was Commanding Officer (CO) of the 64th Field Company, Royal Engineers.

Between the wars, Woolner served with the Royal Engineers in Gold Coast, Woolwich, India and Chatham. He attended the Staff College, Camberley from 1927 to 1928.

In 1939 he was Deputy Inspector and Deputy Commandant of the Royal School of Military Engineering and during the Second World War Woolner served as a staff officer with the British Expeditionary Force (BEF) during the Battle of France before becoming commander of the 8th Infantry Brigade. For his services in France and Belgium he was twice mentioned in despatches. He was promoted to the acting rank of major general on 30 November 1940. His major general's rank was made permanent on 1 October 1941. From 1941 to 1943, he was General Officer Commanding (GOC) Sierra Leone & Gambia and in June 1942 was made a Companion of the Order of the Bath in 1942. Between March and August 1943 he served as GOC of the 81st (West Africa) Division. He then served as commander of the West Midlands District in the United Kingdom until the end of the war.

In 1947, Woolner was GOC 53rd (Welsh) Infantry Division until his retirement in November 1947 with the rank of major general.

References

Bibliography

External links
British Army Officers 1939−1945
Generals of World War II

|-

1893 births
1984 deaths
British Army major generals
British Army generals of World War II
British Army personnel of World War I
Companions of the Order of the Bath
Graduates of the Royal Military Academy, Woolwich
Graduates of the Staff College, Camberley
People educated at Marlborough College
People from Kensington
Military personnel from London
Recipients of the Military Cross
Royal Engineers officers